Calvin Marshall Trillin (born 5 December 1935) is an American journalist, humorist, food writer, poet, memoirist and novelist. He is a winner of the Thurber Prize for American Humor (2012) and an elected member of the American Academy of Arts and Letters (2008).

Early life and education 
Calvin Trillin was born in Kansas City, Missouri in 1935 to Edythe and Abe Trillin. In his book Messages from My Father, he said his parents called him "Buddy". Raised Jewish, he attended public schools in Kansas City, graduated from Southwest High School, and went on to Yale University, where he was the roommate and friend of Peter M. Wolf (for whose 2013 memoir, My New Orleans, Gone Away, he wrote a humorous foreword), and where he served as chairman of the Yale Daily News and was a member of the Pundits and Scroll and Key before graduating in 1957; he later served as a Fellow of the University.

Career 
After serving in the U.S. Army, Trillin worked as a reporter for Time magazine, then joined the staff of The New Yorker in 1963. He wrote the magazine's U.S. Journal series from 1967 to 1982, covering local events both serious and quirky throughout the United States. His reporting for the magazine on the racial integration of the University of Georgia was published in his first book, An Education in Georgia (1964).

From 1975 to 1987, Trillin contributed articles to Moment Magazine, an independent magazine which focuses on the life of the American Jewish community.

Trillin has also written for The Nation magazine. He began in 1978 with a column called Variations, which was eventually renamed Uncivil Liberties; it ran through 1985. The same name – Uncivil Liberties – was used for the column when it was syndicated weekly in newspapers, from 1986 to 1995, and essentially the same column ran (without a name) in Time magazine from 1996 to 2001. His humor columns for The Nation often made fun of the editor of the time, Victor Navasky, whom he jokingly referred to as the wily and parsimonious Navasky.  (He once wrote that the magazine paid "in the high two figures.")  From the July 2, 1990, issue of The Nation to today, Trillin has written his weekly "Deadline Poet" column – humorous poems about current events. Trillin has  written considerably more pieces than any other person for The Nation.

Family, travel and food are also themes in Trillin's work. Three of his books—American Fried; Alice, Let's Eat; and Third Helpings—were individually published and are also collected in the 1994 compendium The Tummy Trilogy.  The most autobiographical of his works are Messages from My Father, Family Man, and an essay in the March 27, 2006, New Yorker, "Alice, Off the Page", discussing his late wife. A slightly expanded version of the latter essay, entitled About Alice, was published as a book on December 26, 2006. In Messages from My Father, Trillin recounts how his father always expected his son to be a Jew, but had primarily "raised me to be an American".

Trillin has also written a collection of short stories – Barnett Frummer Is an Unbloomed Flower (1969) – and three comic novels, Runestruck (1977), Floater (1980), and Tepper Isn't Going Out (2001). This last novel is about a man who enjoys parking in New York City for its own sake and is unusual among novels for exploring the subject of parking.

In 2008, Trillin was elected to the American Academy of Arts and Letters. The same year, The Library of America selected Trillin's essay "Stranger with a Camera" for inclusion in its two-century retrospective of American True Crime. In 2012, Trillin was awarded the Thurber Prize for American Humor for Quite Enough of Calvin Trillin: Forty Years of Funny Stuff, published by Random House. In 2013, he was inducted into the New York Writers Hall of Fame.

Personal life 
In 1965, Trillin married the educator and writer Alice Stewart Trillin, with whom he had two daughters. Alice died in 2001. He also has four grandchildren. Trillin lives in the Greenwich Village area of New York City.

Bibliography

References

External links
Column archive at The Nation

"Calvin Trillin Is Going Out — to Eat (Again)", Dave Weich, Powells.com 
Strolling and Snacking with Calvin Trillin The New York Times
"The Salon Interview: Calvin Trillin"
"Chillin’ with Calvin Trillin" Interview by Pamela Ryckman, The Brooklyn Rail (June 2005)
Politics In Verse With Calvin Trillin Interview.

1935 births
Living people
Writers from Kansas City, Missouri
20th-century American novelists
21st-century American novelists
Jewish American novelists
American columnists
American food writers
American humorists
American male journalists
American male novelists
American travel writers
Yale University alumni
The Nation (U.S. magazine) people
The New Yorker people
People from Greenwich Village
20th-century American male writers
21st-century American male writers
Novelists from New York (state)
Novelists from Missouri
James Beard Foundation Award winners
20th-century American non-fiction writers
21st-century American non-fiction writers
21st-century American Jews
Members of the American Academy of Arts and Letters